The following is a list of sword and sorcery films.  These tend to focus on single heroes, romance, and magic.

List

1920s
 Die Nibelungen (1924)

1940s
 The Iron Crown (1941)
 Kashchey the Deathless (1944)

1950s

 The Magic Sword (1950)
 Prince Valiant (1954)
 Ilya Muromets (1956)
 The 7th Voyage of Sinbad (1958)
 Sleeping Beauty (1959, animated)
 Hercules Unchained  (1959)

1960s

 Hercules in the Haunted World (1962)
 Jack the Giant Killer (1962)
 The Magic Sword (1962)
 Jason and the Argonauts (1963)
 Hercules the Avenger (1965)
 Treasure of the Petrified Forest (1965)
 The Great Adventure of Horus, Prince of the Sun (1968, anime)

1970s

 Ruslan and Ludmila (1972)
 The Golden Voyage of Sinbad (1973)
 Sinbad and the Eye of the Tiger (1977)
 Wizards (1977, animated)
 The Hobbit (1977, animated)
 The Lord of the Rings (1978, animated)
 Warlords of Atlantis (1978)

1980s Fantasy Movies

 Black Angel (1980)
 Hawk the Slayer (1980)
 The Return of the King (1980, animated)
 Clash of the Titans (1981)
 Dragonslayer (1981)
 Excalibur (1981)
 Heavy Metal (1981)
 The Archer (TV film) (1982)
 Ator l'invincibile (1982) (Ator 1)
 The Sword of the Barbarians (1982)
 The Beastmaster (1982)
 Conan the Barbarian (1982)
 The Flight of Dragons (1982, animated)
 Gunan, King of the Barbarians (1982)
 Hero (1982)
 The Sword and the Sorcerer (1982)
 Sorceress (1982)
 Conquest (1983)
 Ironmaster (1983)
 Thor the Conqueror (1983)
 Deathstalker (1983)
 Fire and Ice (1983, animated)
 Hearts and Armour (1983)
 Hercules (1983)
 Hundra (1983)
 Krull (1983)
 The Throne of Fire (1983)
 Ator 2 - L'invincibile Orion (1984) (Ator 2)
 Conan the Destroyer (1984)
 The Devil's Sword (1984)
 The NeverEnding Story (1984)
 Sword of the Valiant (1984)
 The Warrior and the Sorceress (1984)
 Barbarian Queen (1985)
 The Black Cauldron (1985, animated)
 Ladyhawke (1985)
 Legend (1985)
 Red Sonja (1985)
 Starchaser: The Legend of Orin (1985)
 Wizards of the Lost Kingdom  (1985)
 Amazons (1986)
 The Barbarians (1987)
 Deathstalker II (1987)
 (Mio in) The Land of Faraway (1987)
 Stormquest (1987)
 Iron Warrior (1987) (Ator 3)
 Masters of the Universe (1987)
 The Princess Bride (1987)
 Deathstalker III (1988) 
 Willow (1988)
 Erik the Viking (1989)
 Sinbad of the Seven Seas (1989)

1990s

 The NeverEnding Story II: The Next Chapter (1990)
 Quest for the Mighty Sword (1990) (Ator 4)
 Barbarian Queen II: The Empress Strikes Back (1990)
 Beastmaster 2: Through the Portal of Time (1991)
 Deathstalker IV: Match of Titans (1991)
 Army of Darkness (1992)
 Quest of the Delta Knights (1993)
 Yamato Takeru (1994)
 First Knight (1995)
 Beastmaster III: The Eye of Braxus (1996)
 Dragonheart (1996)
 Kull the Conqueror (1997)
 The 13th Warrior (1999)

2000s

 Dungeons and Dragons (2000)
 Dragonheart: A New Beginning (2000)
 Demonicus (2001)
 The Hexer (2001)
 The Lord of the Rings: The Fellowship of the Ring (2001)
 The Scorpion King (2002)
 Ariana's Quest (2002)
 The Lord of the Rings: The Two Towers (2002)
 Barbarian (2003)
 The Red Knight (2003)
 The Lord of the Rings: The Return of the King (2003)
 Dark Kingdom: The Dragon King (2004)
 BloodRayne (2005)
 Wolfhound (2006)
 In the Name of the King (2007)
 The Scorpion King 2: Rise of a Warrior (2008)
 The Pagan Queen (2009)

2010s

 Tales of an Ancient Empire (2010)
 Conan the Barbarian (2011)
 In the Name of the King 2: Two Worlds (2011)
 Ronal the Barbarian (2011, animated)
 The Hobbit: An Unexpected Journey (2012)
 The Scorpion King 3: Battle for Redemption (2012)
 The Hobbit: The Desolation of Smaug (2013)
 The Hobbit: The Battle of the Five Armies (2014)
 The Scorpion King 4: Quest for Power (2015)
 Dragonheart 3: The Sorcerer's Curse (2015)
 Dragonheart: Battle for the Heartfire (2017)

2020s
 Dragonheart: Vengeance (2020)
 Onward (2020, animated)
 The Spine of Night (2021)
 The Northman (2022)

See also
List of high fantasy films and TV series
 Peplum (film genre)

References

 
Sword and sorcery films
1980s in film